Dresser may refer to:

Furniture
 A chest of drawers in a bedroom
 A dressing table
 A Welsh dresser (often called a "china hutch" in the United States), used to store and display crockery and cutlery in a kitchen, scullery or dining room

Film and theater 

 Dresser (theatre), theatrical stagehand involved with costumes
 The Dresser, a 1980 play by Ronald Harwood
 The Dresser (1983 film), a film adaptation of the play starring Albert Finney and Tom Courtenay
 The Dresser (2015 film), a TV adaptation of the play starring Anthony Hopkins and Ian McKellen
 Hamlet's Dresser, a memoir by Bob Smith about his experiences as a dresser

Places
 Dresser, California, community in Alameda County
 Dresser, Indiana, a ghost town in Vigo County
 Dresser, Wisconsin, small town in Polk County, Wisconsin
 Dresser (CDP), Indiana
 Dresser Island
 Dresser Tower

Others
 Dresser (surname)
 Dresser Industries, multinational corporation based in Dallas, Texas
 Full-dresser, a large touring motorcycle with panniers, topbox and fairing
 Grinding dresser, a tool to dress the surface of a grinding wheel
 Window dresser, shop display designer

See also 
 The Dresser (disambiguation)
 Dress (disambiguation)